Dick Kramer (born 1 November 1972) is a Dutch former cricketer.

Kramer was born at The Hague in November 1972. A club cricketer for Quick Haag, Kramer made his debut in List A one-day cricket for the Netherlands against Durham in the 1999 NatWest Trophy, an English domestic one-day tournament the Netherlands were invited to take part in. With the Dutch defeating Durham, they advanced to the next round of the competition against Kent, where Kramer claimed the wicket of Andrew Symonds as his first List A wicket. He was selected in the Dutch squad for the 2000 ICC Emerging Nations Tournament, where he made a further four one-day appearances. Against Denmark he took a five wicket haul, with figures of 5 for 26 in a Dutch victory. His final one-day appearance came in the 2000 NatWest Trophy against Lincolnshire. In seven one-day appearances, Kramer took 9 wickets at an average of 27.33.

References

External links

1972 births
Living people
Sportspeople from The Hague
Dutch cricketers